is a 2007 Japanese satiric Japanese horror film produced by Shochiku Corporation and directed by Masato Harada. Many of the cast are members of the AKB48 idol girl group.

Synopsis 
Anzu Natsuno (Yuko Oshima), a student at an all-girl high school, is walking in the hallway when she hears a mysterious melody coming from the auditorium. There, she finds her classmate Kana (Atsuko Maeda) singing and Anzu's soon shocked when she sees Kana committing suicide after the song ends.

A few days later, Anzu is approached by magazine columnist Riku Nagase (Ryuhei Matsuda), who explains that he's investigating an urban legend of Densen Uta, or the infectious song, that turns whoever sings the song suicidal. Riku convinces Anzu and her friends to sing the song to see if there's any truth to the urban legend.  They reluctantly agree and sing the song.

Over next few days the girls, one by one, kill themselves, leaving Anzu to fight for her life. Coming closer to the source of the song, Anzu finds out about an unimaginable secret relating to her past and the song.

Cast
Ryuhei Matsuda as Riku Nagase
Yūsuke Iseya as Taichi
Atsuko Maeda as Kana Takahashi
Yuko Oshima as Apricot (Anzu) Natsuno 
Sayaka Akimoto as Shuri Matsuda
Haruna Kojima as Kiriko
Yoshino Kimura as Ranko Kaburagi
Hiroshi Abe as Jake
Minami Takahashi as Ai
Minami Minegishi as Rumi Inoue
Erena Ono as Sae Miyaguchi 
Tomomi Kasai as Asuka Kumoi
Kayo Noro as Miki Oribe
Sae Miyazawa as C-chan
Michiru Hoshino as Michiko Goi
Shoko Ikezu as Riki Nagase / Enma
Satoru Matsuo as Otaku Soldier
Yasunari Takeshima as Bazooka
Toshihiro Yashiba as Shin'ya Kudô
Yasuto Kosuda as Anzu's Father

See also 
AKB48
Gloomy Sunday
Cinema of Japan

External links 
 
 
 Nippon Cinema 

2007 films
Films directed by Masato Harada
Japanese horror films
AKB48
Shochiku films
Films about curses
Films about music and musicians
Films about suicide
2000s Japanese films